Different areas of the world have local variations on the hot dog, in the type of meat used, the condiments added, and its means of preparation.

United States 
Hot dogs are a very popular sandwich  throughout the United States.  Many regional variations exist.

Alaska
Hot dogs made with caribou meat added are sold as "reindeer dogs" throughout Alaska.

Arizona

The Sonoran hot dog is popular in Tucson, Phoenix, and elsewhere in southern Arizona, as well as in the neighboring Mexican state of Sonora. It is a hot dog wrapped in mesquite-smoked bacon, cooked on a grill or on a griddle or comal, then topped with pinto beans, onions, tomatoes, mayonnaise, mustard and jalapeño salsa or sauce, and served on a bolillo roll, often with a side of fresh-roasted chili pepper. It originated in Hermosillo, the capital of Sonora.

California
In Los Angeles, Pink's Hot Dogs promotes its celebrity customers and its chili dogs, the latter of which come in a wide number of varieties.  A local chain, Tommy's, also has chili dogs featuring a premium natural casing hot dog alongside its much better-known chili hamburgers, and another local chain The Hat, which specializes in pastrami, has them also.

Other notable Los Angeles chains that specialize in hot dogs include Hot Dog On A Stick, which serves a preparation similar to a corn dog, and Wienerschnitzel, a chain that bills itself as "The World's Largest Hot Dog Chain." The Farmer John Dodger Dog is sold at Dodger Stadium.

Street vendors in Los Angeles also serve the "Downtown Dog" or "LA Street Dog" a Mexican-style bacon-wrapped hot dog with grilled onions, jalapeños, and bell peppers, and mustard, ketchup, and mayonnaise as condiments. These are typically sold around closing time outside nightclubs and bars by street vendors, who grill the hot dogs on small push-carts. The legality of such operations may be questionable, leading locals to sometimes refer to these treats as "Danger Dogs".

Connecticut

Connecticut hot dog restaurants often serve sausages produced by local family operations such as Hummel Bros, Martin Rosol, or Grote & Weigel, with national brands being relatively less common. The hot dogs are typically served on New England rolls. There is otherwise no particular Connecticut style though deep frying and homemade condiments are common.

Georgia
In Columbus, Georgia, a local favorite is the "scrambled dog," the exemplar of which was first served at the Dinglewood Pharmacy by "The Lieutenant" Charles Stevens over 50 years ago.  The scrambled dog is a chopped hot dog covered by chili, onions and pickles with an accompanying portion of oyster crackers.

In Fitzgerald, Georgia, Johnnie's Drive In served the "scrambled dog" beginning in the early 1940s. Johnnie's scrambled dog is two sliced hot dogs over a hot dog bun with mustard and catsup and covered with oyster crackers, chili, cole slaw, and sliced dill pickles.

Illinois

The Chicago-style hot dog is a steamed kosher-style all-beef, natural-casing hot dog on a steamed poppy seed bun, topped with yellow mustard, chopped white onions, a dill pickle spear, tomato slices, Chicago-style relish, hot sport peppers, and a dash of celery salt. Chicago-style hot dogs do not include ketchup.

This "dragged through the garden" style (more commonly called, "with the works"), is heavily promoted by Vienna Beef and Red Hot Chicago, the two most prominent Chicago hot dog manufacturers, but exceptions are common, with vendors adding cucumbers or lettuce, omitting poppy seeds or celery salt, or using plain relish or a skinless hot dog. Several popular hot dog stands serve a simpler version: a steamed natural-casing dog with only mustard, onions, plain relish and sport peppers, wrapped up with hand-cut fries, while the historic Superdawg drive-ins notably substitute a pickled tomato.

Kansas and Missouri
A Kansas City-style hot dog is a pork sausage in a sesame seed bun topped with brown mustard, sauerkraut and melted Swiss cheese.

Maine
The most popular variety of hot dog in Maine is made with natural casing. The casing is colored red, and one company refers to their red variety as red snappers and "red rockets".

Massachusetts
In Boston, hot dogs are often served steamed as opposed to grilled. The Fenway Frank, served at Fenway Park, is a fixture for Red Sox fans, and there are several other local brands such as Pearl that are used. Hot dogs in the Boston area are associated with Boston baked beans, though this is not unique to the region. Ketchup, mustard, relish, picalilli, and chopped onions are the most common toppings.

Michigan
In southeastern Michigan, restaurants serve what's known as a Coney dog, developed early in the 20th century by Greek immigrants. "Coney joints" are very specific as to the ingredients: a beef or beef and pork European-style Vienna sausage of German origin in a natural lamb or sheep casing, topped with a spiced sauce made with ground beef heart, one or two stripes of yellow mustard and diced or chopped white onions. There are three variations on the Coney dog: Jackson style, which started in 1914 with a ground beef sauce prior to switching to ground beef heart in the early 1940s, Detroit style, first served in 1917 and made with a more soupy beef heart-based sauce, and Flint style, with Flint Coney Island opening in 1924 serving a specially-developed Koegel's coney topped with thicker, meatier sauce based on a Macedonian goulash, made almost entirely of a finely ground beef heart blend from Abbott's Meat. With over 350 chain and independent purveyors of these dogs in the metro-Detroit area alone, an entire restaurant industry has developed from the hot dog and are called Coney Islands. A coney dog is not to be confused with a chili dog, a more generic ground beef-based chili-topped hot dog.  See Coney Island hot dog.

New Jersey
New Jersey's Italian hot dog includes diced fried potatoes combined with brown mustard served on a spicy hot dog.  The most common brands of spicy hot dogs used are Sabrett's or Best's, both of which are NJ companies.  A traditional Italian Hot Dog is made by cutting a round "pizza bread" in half (for a double) or into quarters (for a single), cutting a pocket into it and spreading the inside with mustard.  A deep-fried dog (or two if it is a double) is put in the pocket, topped with fried (or sautéed) onions and peppers, and then topped off with crisp-fried potato chunks.  A variation of this, often found at express takeout restaurants (such as "chicken shacks," Chinese restaurants, pizzerias, etc., and can also be requested at some lunch trucks and luncheonettes across the state) substitutes French fries for the traditional potato round, and in some spots a Portuguese or sub roll replaces the traditional round bread used.

The Texas wiener or Hot Texas wiener was created in Paterson, New Jersey sometime before 1920. A traditional Texas wiener is blanched in cool oil, finished in hot oil, and topped with spicy mustard, chopped onions, and a chili sauce.

New York

In New York City, the natural-casing all-beef hot dogs served at Katz's Delicatessen, Gray's Papaya, Papaya King, Papaya Dog and any Sabrett cart are all made by Sabrett's parent company, Marathon Enterprises, Inc. Nathan's hot dogs, which are all-beef and come in both natural-casing and skinless, were also made by Marathon until several years ago. Local kosher brands—which are not permitted natural casings—include Hebrew National, Empire National. The usual condiments are mustard and sauerkraut, with optional sweet onions in a tomato based sauce invented by Alan Geisler, usually made by Sabrett. Hot dogs are available on street corners as well as at delicatessens.  New York street vendors generally store their unsold dogs in warm-water baths, giving rise to the semi-affectionate moniker "dirty water dog." Bagel dogs are also sold in Manhattan.

The white hot or "porker" is a variation on the hot dog found mostly in the Rochester area.  It is composed of some combination of uncured and unsmoked pork, beef, and veal; it is believed that the lack of smoking or curing allows the meat to retain a naturally white color.

A Michigan hot dog, Michigan red hot, or simply "michigan", is a steamed all-beef hot dog on a steamed bun topped with a meaty sauce, generally referred to as "michigan sauce", and is a specialty in and around Plattsburgh, New York.

In the Capital District surrounding Albany, smaller-than-usual wieners are served with a spicy meat sauce; the Capital District style is quite similar to the New York System or Hot Wieners of Rhode Island. In the mid-twentieth century, hot dog purveyors reportedly would carry the dogs to the table lined up on their bare forearms, giving rise to the term "the Hairy Arm"; today, health codes prohibit this practice. Further north, in three locations in and around Glens Falls, New Way Lunch has served similar hot dogs with meat sauce, mustard, and raw onions for nearly 100 years.

Texas hots have a niche following in western New York. A 2017 article in the Olean Times Herald made note of the dish's disappearance from the city of Olean.

North Carolina
In North Carolina, hot dogs have a distinct red color and are prepared Carolina style which includes chili, cole slaw and onions; locally, mustard sometimes replaces slaw, or is added as a fourth item. Merritt's Burger House has been serving Carolina hot dogs since 1958.

Ohio
In Cincinnati, a hot dog topped with Cincinnati chili is called a "coney," and when grated cheddar cheese is added, a "cheese coney."  The default coney also includes mustard and diced onion.

In Toledo, Tony Packo's Cafe sells "world famous" "Hungarian Hot Dogs," which were the subject of multiple of MASH episodes.

Pennsylvania
There are several variety of local dog recipes in Pennsylvania. In Philadelphia, street vendors sell hot dogs that can be topped with one or more of several traditional Philadelphia toppings: ketchup, mustard (yellow and/or spicy brown), chopped onion (cooked/soft or raw), relish, and (without exception) sauerkraut. In the Lehigh Valley region of Pennsylvania, there is regional Yocco's Hot Dogs, which maintains four locations in the region.

Various shops and butchers in Pennsylvania make traditional German natural casing franks. Altoona, Pennsylvania has two remaining Texas Hot Dog stands that claim a legacy going back to 1918. The Texas Tommy was invented in Pottstown, Pennsylvania, and is prepared with bacon and cheese.

Rhode Island
The hot wiener or New York System wiener is a staple of the food culture of Rhode Island.

Texas 
The Houston style hot dog consists of a beef dog on a toasted potato bun, which has been spread with cream cheese. The dog is split lengthwise and filled with curry ketchup. It is topped with special grilled caramelized onions, French-fried onions, honey mayo and sriracha sauce. Other condiments sometimes include spicy mustard and green sauce. The Houston style dog has spread into other cities and can be found in suburbs like Sugarland and as far away as College Station and Austin.

Washington

In Seattle, hot dogs are served with cream cheese and grilled onions on a toasted bun. The sausages are split in half and grilled before being put in the bun. Stands offer a variety of condiments, such as Sriracha sauce and jalapeños.

West Virginia

A hot dog with a chili sauce made with finely ground meat, chopped fresh onions, coleslaw and yellow mustard."The Art of Bun, Chili + Slaw, West Virginia Style" , The Local Palate. Retrieved July 16, 2016. "Even more telling is the nature of the chili on each. This is not your mama’s bowl chili with chunks of meat and arguable accouterments like beans, tomatoes, peppers and, Lord help us, sometimes spaghetti. Chili Bun Chili is a finely grained aggregate of ground beef, spices and something to make it all hold together in the bun."

Canada 
The Whistle Dog is served by some  A&W restaurants in Canada. A whistle dog is a hot dog that has been split and served with processed cheese, bacon, and relish.

Montreal

A Montreal-style hot dog, as popularized by numerous shops such as the famous Montreal Pool Room, is either steamed or griddle fried (nicknamed steamies or toasties, respectively). It is generally served topped with coleslaw, onion, relish and mustard; ketchup, mayonnaise and occasionally paprika or chili powder may be added at a condiment counter by the customer. Due to the bilingual nature of Montreal street culture, these are usually ordered, and condiments named, in Franglais. Montreal hot dogs can be found throughout Eastern Canada and the United States.

Latin America

Brazil

In 1926, the Spanish entrepreneur in Brazil and founder of Cinelândia, began selling  (lit. "hot dog") at his cinemas. It inspired Lamartine Babo and Ary Barroso to create the song "Cachorro-Quente," a marchinha de carnaval. In the period following World War II, as Brazil came under considerable US cultural influence, the  came to cement its position in Brazil.

In the State of Piauí in the Northeast region of Brazil, the hot dog is made from a long and soft bread cut in half. Its flavorings vary in the cafeterias of the region, the most found are: sausage topped with spicy sauce, meat, corn green Lint and slices of melted cheese.

Chile

In Chile, there is a popular variation called completo (Spanish for "complete", "full") which, besides bread and sausages, can be made up of mashed avocado, chopped tomatoes, mayonnaise, sauerkraut, salsa Americana, Chilean chili, green sauce and cheese. Its size can be twice that of an American hot dog.

Guatemala
In Guatemala shucos are sold across the country, especially in the country's capital, Guatemala City. Shucos are usually served with guacamole, boiled cabbage, mayonnaise, mustard, and an assorted choice of meats. Chopped onions are added by a decent amount of shuqueros (hot dog vendors) across Guatemala City and Antigua. The most popular choices of meats are sausage, chorizo (red sausage), salami, longaniza (white sausage), and bacon. They are cooked in a charcoal grill and hot sauce is offered at customer's request.

Asia

Japan

In Japan, hot dogs are used in bento boxes and are often sliced to resemble an octopus. More conventional hot dogs are also available, either on a stick (with or without a coating) or on a bun. Japanese Fusion Dogs, such as those sold at the Vancouver-based chain Japadog, are not actually from Japan but are a Pacific Northwest invention that pairs hot dogs with Japanese and Asian condiments like wasabi, kimchi and teriyaki.

Malaysia
In October 2016 the Malaysian Islamic Development Department ruled that hot dog vendors must rename their product or risk not getting halal certification, because in Islam dogs are considered unclean.  The Malaysian Tourism and Culture Minister criticized the ruling and said, "Even in Malay it's called hot dog — it's been around for so many years. I'm a Muslim and I'm not offended."

Philippines

In the Philippines, hot dogs are eaten as is, in a bun with an optional selection of condiments, or with rice and condiments. Hot dogs are also typically served during breakfast. They are also skewered and grilled over coals, and sold as street food. Skewered waffle hot dogs are also available in the country (a local variant having the hot dogs coated in hotcake batter and then deep-fried). Chopped hot dogs are an ingredient in Filipino spaghetti. They are also used in various other dishes (e.g. as a filling in an embutido, as sliced pieces of meat in tomato-based savories such as caldereta or menudo, etc.).

South Korea
A popular South Korean form of the hot dog, sold at street stalls, fairs, and some fast-food restaurants, involves the placing of the sausage on a stick, followed by a batter of some kind, and sometimes including french fries in the batter. They more resemble a corn dog than a hot dog. Ketchup is a common condiment, and occasionally mustard. Hot dogs in a bun or wrapped in bread are also widely available, or on a stick without a bun.

Taiwan
Taiwanese style hot dogs are put on a bun or without a bun on a stick. In night markets, meat sausages are sometimes wrapped with an outer sticky rice sausage in a snack called small sausage in large sausage.

Thailand

Hot dogs are very popular in Thailand and are also used in various ways in Thai cuisine. It can be sold inside a bun similar to a standard American hot dog but instead of tomato ketchup, they are also often eaten with a sweet tomato-chili sauce. Very popular are street vendors selling hot dogs which have been deep-fried or charcoal grilled. They are served with either a sweet, slightly spicy sauce (nam chim wan) or a very spicy sauce (nam chim phet). Hot dogs can also be used as a filling for a croissant which are served with mayonnaise. Hot dogs are even used as a filling for raisin bread together with shredded dried pork. The Thai dish called khao phat Amerikan or American fried rice, rice fried with tomato ketchup and containing raisins, is always served with hot dogs and a fried egg. Donut sai krok is the Thai name for a sausage filled savoury donut in the shape of a log. Hot dog sausages also feature as an ingredient, together with onion, celery or coriander (cilantro) leaves, lime juice, fish sauce and chili peppers, for a Thai salad called yam hot dok. Another dish that uses hot dogs is called khanom Tokiao (lit. 'Tokyo cake'). This is a Thai style crêpe which is wrapped around a filling of hot dog and sweet chili sauce. The chili sauce can also be served on the side.

Europe

Czech Republic

Hot dogs in the Czech Republic are known as párek v rohlíku, which can be literally translated as "sausage in roll", with the label "hot dog" also applied in marketing to both locals and tourists. Czech-style hot dogs are differentiated by the fact that rather than slicing the bun in half and placing the sausage into the resultant cleavage, the top of the bun is cut off, with a hole punched into the softer inside of the bun where condiments and then the sausage is placed, similar to the Ketwurst. Specially designed appliances (stroj na párek v rohlíku, literally appliance for sausage in bun) that consist of a hot-water cooker for the sausages and heated metal spikes to punch the holes and pre-warm the buns also exist to assist vendors with preparation of this dish.

Denmark 

The Danish-style hot dog has spread to the other Scandinavian countries as well as Germany. Steff Houlberg/Tulip corporation operates 4300 hot dog stands in Denmark alone, and has also opened a chain in Korea, Japan, and China.

Germany 

Even though the type of sausage that led to the creation of the modern hot dog in the United States is undeniably German, German hot dog culture is mainly influenced by Scandinavian—mostly Danish—elements. This does not affect the type of sausage (unlike the Danish rød pølse, German hot dogs usually have frankfurt- or wiener-style sausages) but the condiments—ketchup, mustard or Danish-style remoulade depending on individual preference as well as roasted onions and thinly sliced pickles—are usually marketed as a Danish influence. While sauerkraut is a common, distinctively German, topping in the US, it is not typical in Germany. Grilling the sausage, which is common in America, is largely unknown in Germany where it is steamed like its Scandinavian counterparts.

Iceland 

The Iceland Monitor writes that "locals, expatriates and holiday-makers alike must all be familiar with Iceland’s national dish—hot-dogs with all the trimmings (‘pylsa með öllu’ in Icelandic). The hot-dog sausage is served in bread and liberally accompanied with fried onion, raw onion, mustard, ketchup and remoulade (a cold sauce made with mayonnaise and various condiments and herbs). This delicious snack is traditionally washed down with copious amounts of Coca-Cola."

In August 2006, the British newspaper The Guardian selected Iceland's Bæjarins beztu as the best hot dog stand in Europe. Bæjarins beztu pylsur (English: The best hot dog in town) often shortened to simply "Bæjarins beztu," is a popular hot dog stand in central Reykjavík. Hot dogs from this stand are derived from the Danish hot dog. They are often ordered with "the works," i.e., all condiments, or in Icelandic "eina með öllu". Icelandic hot dogs are made from Icelandic lamb, pork and beef and served with a mix of raw white and fried onion, ketchup, sweet brown mustard, and remoulade.

Norway

In Norway, sausages are most often served in white buns, or in a traditional lompe. The sausages are grilled or warmed in hot water, and they are normally served with ketchup or mustard. Alternative condiments includes potato salad, shrimp salad, fried or raw onions. Many Norwegians will order "pølse med alt", a hot dog with all the condiments. Local specialties occur, such as reindeer dogs in the north and hot dogs served in a waffle in the south east.

Sweden 
In Sweden hot dogs are served in a bread and topped with mustard and ketchup, additional toppings include roasted onion, shrimp salad, bostongurka or mashed potatoes, the latter goes by the name of "Halv Special" (half special). "Varmkorv med bröd" (hot dog with bread) is widely sold all over Sweden at most street corners from stands and in kiosks and fast food restaurants.

Ukraine
In Ukraine beside more classic hot dogs there is a variation called slow-dog. Different types of boiled sausages served in a partially sliced brioche or malt bread with various toppings, such as beetroot, salt and vinegar flavoured potato chips, chili peppers, paprika, lettuce, cucumber, buckwheat popcorn, hazelnut rusk, and sauces.

United Kingdom

Genuine "hot dogs" in the American style are very popular in US-themed restaurants, amusement parks and in particular, at cinemas, and one can even find specialist 'gourmet' hot dog and champagne establishments in cities such as London.

See also

 Cheese dog
 Chili dog
 List of hot dogs
 List of hot dog restaurants
 List of sandwiches
 List of sausage dishes
 World's longest hot dog

References

Further reading
 
 Christoff, Chris (April 1, 2014). "Detroit’s Coney Island Hot Dogs Are Edible Solace for City". Bloomberg.

 .
 .
 
 
 Yung, Katherine and Joe Grimm (2012). Coney Detroit. Detroit, Michigan: Wayne State University Press. .

Lists of foods
Hot dogs
World cuisine